Simona Rumyanova Petkova (born 3 September 1993) is a Bulgarian footballer who plays as a midfielder for Swiss Women's Super League club FC Aarau Frauen and the Bulgaria women's national team.

International career
Petkova was capped most recently for Bulgaria at senior level in a 0–6 friendly loss to Croatia on 14 June 2019.

Honours
Bulgaria Women's Footballer of the Year - 2021, 2022

References

1993 births
Living people
People from Gabrovo
Bulgarian women's footballers
Women's association football midfielders
Watford F.C. Women players
A.S.D. Pink Sport Time players
S.S.D. Empoli Ladies FBC players
San Marino Academy players
Women's Championship (England) players
Serie A (women's football) players
Bulgaria women's international footballers
Bulgarian expatriate footballers
Bulgarian expatriate sportspeople in England
Expatriate women's footballers in England
Bulgarian expatriate sportspeople in Italy
Expatriate women's footballers in Italy
Bulgarian expatriates in San Marino
Expatriate footballers in San Marino
Bulgarian expatriate sportspeople in Switzerland
Expatriate women's footballers in Switzerland
FF Lugano 1976 players